Tambaram Sanatorium is a locality between Chromepet and Tambaram, in Chennai, India. The neighbourhood is served by Tambaram Sanatorium railway station on the Chennai Beach–Villupuram section via Tambaram of the Chennai suburban railway.

Government Hospitals
National Institute of Siddha is a premier institute of Siddha Medicine situated at the Tambaram Sanatorium.
 
The Government Hospital of Thoracic Medicine, popularly known as TB Sanatorium, was started in 1928. It is located along the Grand Southern Trunk Road.

References

Cities and towns in Kanchipuram district